Juan Daniel Pirán (born 23 October 1957) is an Argentine fencer. He competed in the individual and team épée events at the 1976 Summer Olympics.

References

1957 births
Living people
Argentine male fencers
Argentine épée fencers
Olympic fencers of Argentina
Fencers at the 1976 Summer Olympics
Pan American Games medalists in fencing
Pan American Games bronze medalists for Argentina
Fencers at the 1979 Pan American Games
20th-century Argentine people